Khazinovo (Xajı) is a rural locality (a village) in Sayranovsky Selsoviet, Ishimbaysky District, Bashkortostan, Russia. The population was 62 as of 2010. There is 1 street.

Geography 
Khazinovo is located 31 km southeast of Ishimbay (the district's administrative centre) by road. Aznayevo is the nearest rural locality.

References 

Rural localities in Ishimbaysky District